The 2001 Melbourne Cup was the 141st running of the Melbourne Cup, a prestigious Australian Thoroughbred horse race.

It was won by Ethereal, trained by Sheila Laxon and ridden by Scott Seamer.

Field

This is the finishing order of horses which ran in the 2001 Melbourne Cup.

References

2001
Melbourne Cup
Melbourne Cup
2000s in Melbourne
November 2001 sports events in Australia